Robert H. Traurig (June 9, 1925 – July 17, 2018) was an American lawyer and businessman who was one of the founders of the law firm Greenberg Traurig.

He received a Bachelor's degree from the University of Miami and a Juris Doctor from the University of Miami School of Law.

Today, Greenberg Traurig consists of about 2,000 attorneys and government professionals in 42 offices across the globe.

References 

American company founders
1925 births
2018 deaths
University of Miami School of Law alumni
University of Miami alumni
Lawyers from Miami
People from Waterbury, Connecticut
People associated with Greenberg Traurig
20th-century American lawyers